Sangalkam Arrondissement  is an arrondissement of the Rufisque Department in the Dakar Region of Senegal.

Arrondissements of Senegal
Dakar Region